Halqeh Basteh (also Romanized as Ḩalqeh Basteh) is a village in Gasht Rural District, in the Central District of Fuman County, Gilan Province, Iran. Comprising families, its population was 98 as of the 2006 census.

References 

Populated places in Fuman County